102nd meridian may refer to:

102nd meridian east, a line of longitude east of the Greenwich Meridian
102nd meridian west, a line of longitude west of the Greenwich Meridian